The 1999 Westel 900 Budapest Open singles was the singles event of the second edition of the Budapest Grand Prix; a WTA Tier IV tournament and the most prestigious women's tennis tournament held in Hungary. Virginia Ruano Pascual was the defending champion but lost in the first round to Amanda Hopmans.

Sarah Pitkowski won in the final 6–2, 6–2 against Cristina Torrens Valero.

Seeds

Draw

Finals

Top half

Bottom half

Qualifying

Seeds

Qualifiers

Lucky losers
  Sandra Dopfer

Qualifying draw

First qualifier

Second qualifier

Third qualifier

Fourth qualifier

External links
 1999 Westel 900 Budapest Open draw

Budapest Grand Prix
Westel 900 Budapest Open